Chris King is a Democratic politician, who represented Pennsylvania's 142nd Representative District in the Pennsylvania House of Representatives from 2007 to 2008.

King grew up in Middletown Township, Bucks County, and still lives in the township.

In 2002, King entered the race for state representative only three months before the general election, as a late replacement for the Democratic candidate who withdrew. Against incumbent Matt Wright, King took 41% of the vote in the loss.

In 2006, King made a second run at the state house.  In the primary election, he defeated Democrat Larry Lefkowitz with more than two-thirds of the total vote. This time, with many incumbents hobbled by the fallout of the 2005 legislative pay raise, King defeated Wright, taking 52.5% of the vote.

In 2008, he was defeated for re-election by Republican Frank Farry.

References

External links
Biography, voting record, and interest group ratings at Project Vote Smart
Follow the Money - Chris King
2006 2002 campaign contributions

Members of the Pennsylvania House of Representatives
Living people
Year of birth missing (living people)